Banar Kabutaran (also Romanized as Banār Kabūtarān; also known as Banār Kamūtarān) is a village in Seydun-e Shomali Rural District, Seydun District, Bagh-e Malek County, Khuzestan Province, Iran. At the 2006 census, its population was 36, in 5 families.

References 

Populated places in Bagh-e Malek County